It is a very old temple/chattri, dedicated to lord Bhomiaji, the protector of Cows, situated in the Sopara village of Bhopalgarh tehsil, Jodhpur, Rajasthan.

It is located on a small hill, outside the village near a pond.
No exact information is available about when main chattri, dedicated to lord Bhomiaji was built, but the adjoining chattri in memory of Jyotsinghji was built about 25 years ago, in 1990.

Bhomiaji ki Chattri
This is the main Chattri, being the center of the beliefs, rituals and festivals celebrated by the villagers.
There are two stone carved images placed in the chattri, along with an image of horse, the ride of Bhomiaji.

Jyotsinghji ki Chattri
Jyotsinghji was the resident of village, and it is said that he got the divine inside himself and lord used to speak through him. So villagers built another chattri nearby the old one of Bhomiaji, in honour of the great soul.

Gallery

Hindu temples in Rajasthan